R. Balaji Rao (1842–1896) was an Indian politician and Indian independence activist who was a founder and first Secretary of the Madras Mahajana Sabha.

Personal life 

Balaji Rao was born in a Thanjavur Marathi Deshastha Brahmin family in the year 1842. He had his schooling and higher education in Tanjore and Madras and graduated in law. On completion of his studies, Balaji Rao practised as a lawyer before entering the Indian independence movement.

Politics 

Balaji entered politics and was one of the founding members of the Madras Mahajana Sabha. He represented Tanjore at the first session of the Indian National Congress along with S. A. Swaminatha Iyer. Balaji Rao established the Chingleput Ryots Relief Fund for the benefit of the ryots of Chingleput district.

Death 

Balaji Rao died in 1896.

References 

1842 births
1896 deaths
Indian independence activists from Tamil Nadu
Marathi people
20th-century Indian lawyers
People from Thanjavur district